Richard Stephen Lasse (born November 13, 1935) is a former American football linebacker in the National Football League (NFL) and college football coach. He graduated from Worcester Academy in 1954.

Professional playing career
Lasse played for five years in the National Football League for the Pittsburgh Steelers, the Washington Redskins, and the New York Giants.  Before entering the NFL, he played college football at Syracuse University.

Coaching career

Curry
Lasse had his first college coaching job at Curry College in Milton, Massachusetts.  Lasse was the first football coach and started the program in 1965 with an inaugural win-less season of 0–5.  He coach at Curry for  until 1968 and accumulated a record of 3–19.

Geneva
Lasse was the 27th head football coach at Geneva College located in Beaver Falls, Pennsylvania and he held that position for two seasons, from 1974 until 1975.  His coaching record at Geneva was 1–17.

References

External links
 

1935 births
Living people
American football linebackers
Curry Colonels football coaches
Geneva Golden Tornadoes football coaches
Hamilton Tiger-Cats players
New York Giants players
Pittsburgh Steelers players
Syracuse Orange football players
Washington Redskins players
Sportspeople from Quincy, Massachusetts
Coaches of American football from Massachusetts
Players of American football from Massachusetts